The dimple sign or Fitzpatrick's sign is a dermatological sign in which lateral pressure on the skin produces a depression. It is associated with dermatofibroma.

References

Further reading
 
 

Dermatologic signs
Medical signs